The Flute and the Arrow is a 1957 Swedish drama film directed by Arne Sucksdorff. It was entered into the 1958 Cannes Film Festival.

Cast
 Chendru as The Boy
 Ginjo as The Hunter
 Riga as The Hunter's Wife
 TengruasShikari as The Boy's Grandfather

References

External links

1957 films
1957 drama films
1950s Swedish-language films
1950s Swedish films
Swedish drama films
Films directed by Arne Sucksdorff
Films scored by Ravi Shankar
Films set in India